Ghar Sansar  is a 1986 Indian Hindi-language drama film, produced by Vimal Kumar under the Shivam Chitrya banner and directed by K. Bapayya. It stars Jeetendra, Sridevi  and music composed by Rajesh Roshan. The film is remake of the Telugu movie Maga Maharaju (1983), starring Chiranjeevi, Suhasini in the pivotal roles.

Plot
Prakash, educated yet an unemployed youth, struggles to find a job, his father Satya Narain is a head clerk, has a large family consisting of two sons, two daughters, wife and old mother. The dream child of this family is the eldest son Prakash, but in this era of rampant corruption, Prakash fails to get a respectable job, joins an ironsmith and starts believing in the indignity of labor. His younger brother Chandan proves to be a black sheep and joins a gang of rowdies. Satya Narain manages a further loan to marry the eldest daughter, which is stolen by his brother-in-law, who had come to live like a parasite and demanded his balance dowry. Satya Narain dies of a heart attack, the burden of the family falls on Prakash's shoulders and now he is given a chance to pay off his father's debts by selling their only possession, their house. The maidservant Radhika always stood by this family through thick and thin, who is in love with Prakash. The elder daughter runs away from the house, though she is the sole cause of the untold misery which had befallen the family. Prakash anyway, searches her and marries her. Then it is suddenly revealed that Radhika is the daughter of a very rich man and had left her house due to an ego problem with her father. Chandan, the black sheep, makes all attempts to destroy his own family. Prakash faces these onslaughts bravely. And one day, when Chandan's own rowdy friends want to kill him and his elder brother Prakash, saves him, then his eyes open. 
             END

Cast
 Jeetendra as Prakash
 Sridevi as Radha
 Kader Khan as Girdharilal / Bankelal (Double Role)
 Ranjeet as David
 Shakti Kapoor as Ringo
 Shreeram Lagoo as Satyanarayan
 Sulochana Latkar as Laxmi
 Gulshan Grover as Chandan "Munna"
 Kaajal Kiran as Savitri
 Lalita Pawar as Satyanarayan's Mother
 Ravi Baswani as Banwari
 Padma Khanna as Banwari's Wife
 Aruna Irani as Saudamani
 Bharat Bhushan as Rahim Chacha
 Yunus Parvez as Kishanlal
 Pinchoo Kapoor as Interviewer
 Vikas Anand as Savitri's Husband
 Rajendra Nath as Inspector Sharma 
 Anjana Mumtaz as Mrs. Girdharilal 
 Rajesh Puri as David's Henchmen
 Tej Sapru as Ringo's Friend

Soundtrack
Lyrics: Indeevar

References

External links

1980s Hindi-language films
1986 films
Films directed by K. Bapayya
Films scored by Rajesh Roshan
Hindi remakes of Telugu films
Indian family films
Indian drama films
1986 drama films
Hindi-language drama films